DaMarcus Mitchell (born December 13, 1998) is an American football defensive end for the New England Patriots of the National Football League (NFL). He was signed as an undrafted free agent by the Patriots in 2022. Mitchell played college football at Southwest Mississippi Community College and Purdue.

College career
Mitchell committed to Southwest Mississippi Community College out of high school, recording 12 carries for 57 yards as a freshman. He moved to linebacker in his sophomore season for the Bears, recording 71 tackles. In 2020, he was rated a three-star transfer recruit by 247Sports, choosing to transfer to Purdue. He started five games for the Boilermakers, finishing third on the team with 34 tackles and one sack. He recorded 25 tackles and 4.5 sacks in 2021, including four tackles, a sack, and a forced fumble against Tennessee in the 2021 Music City Bowl. After the season, he declared for the 2022 NFL Draft.

Professional career
Mitchell signed with the New England Patriots as an undrafted free agent on April 30, 2022. He made the team's 53-man roster out of training camp.

References

External links
New England Patriots bio
Southwest Mississippi Bears bio
Purdue Boilermakers bio

Living people
New England Patriots players
1998 births